Mahn may refer to:

Carl August Friedrich Mahn, German philologist
Mahn, Iran, a village in Tehran Province